Agglutination Metal Festival is an Italian metal festival held annually in Basilicata, among the towns of Senise, Chiaromonte and Sant'Arcangelo (Potenza). Born in 1995 as an event to promote emerging groups, it is one of the first metal festivals in Italy and one of the most long-lived metal events in Europe.

It has hosted bands such as Overkill, Cannibal Corpse, Venom, Mayhem, Stratovarius, Carcass, Exodus, Gamma Ray, Dark Tranquillity and Marduk. Among the Italian bands that performed at the Agglutination are Rhapsody of Fire, Bulldozer, Necrodeath, Stormlord, Labyrinth and Theatres des Vampires. Due to the containment measures against the COVID-19 pandemic, the festival was not scheduled in 2020 and 2021.

Lineups

1995
August in Chiaromonte Marshall and other local bands

1996
August in Chiaromonte White Skull, Lost Innocence and other local bands

1997
12 August in Chiaromonte Overkill, White Skull, Megora, Aggressive Fear, In Human Memories, Deleterio, Black Sunrise, Flash Terrorist, Stormlord, Lost Innocence, Harem, Funeral Fuck

1998
11 August in Chiaromonte Athena, Undertakers, Lacrima Christi, Heimdall, Glacial Fear, Inchiuvatu, Hastings, Aura, Memories of a Lost Soul, Unthory, Black Sunrise, Funeral Fuck

1999
13 August in Chiaromonte White Skull, Moonlight Comedy, Ahriman, Tenebrae Oburiuntur, Obscure Devotion, 3rd, Terremoto, Kiss of Death, Pino Miale

2000
12 August in Chiaromonte Domine, Vision Divine, Undertakers, Glacial Fear, Stormlord, Art Inferno, Arcadia, Steel Cage, Humanity Eclipse, Eden Shape

2001
11 August in Chiaromonte Ancient, Thoten, White Skull, Secret Sphere, Highlord, The Black, Natron, Schizo, Glacial Fear, Requiem K626, Brazen, Enemynside, Dark Secret, Rainy Night

2002
12 August Chiaromonte Destruction, Vicious Rumors, Drakkar, Undertakers, Stormlord, Heimdall, Infernal Poetry, Holy Knights, Adimiron

2003
9 August in Chiaromonte Virgin Steele, Labyrinth, Theatres des Vampires, Beholder, Fire Trails, Elvenking, Marshall, Rosae Crucis, Mantra, Requiem K626, Hunchback

2004
12 August in Chiaromonte Iron Savior, Marduk, Crystal Ball, Novembre, Centurion, Thy Majestie, Rain, Nameless Crime, Disguise, Walkyrya

2005
13 August in Chiaromonte Mayhem, Freedom Call, Necrodeath, Mesmerize, Schizo, Valiance

2006
10 August in Chiaromonte (cancelled) Vision Divine, Sinister, Majesty, Dark Lunacy, Marshall, Pandaemonium, Kragens, Aleph, Infernal Angels, Megawatt

2007

11 August in Sant'Arcangelo Gamma Ray, Infernal Death, Golem, Kaledon, Dark Lunacy, Fire Trails, Tankard

2008
9 August 2008 in Sant'Arcangelo Dark Tranquility, Vision Divine, Dismember, Domine, Metal Gang with Pino Scotto, DGM, Savior from Anger, Denied, Nefertum

2009
10 August in Sant'Arcangelo U.D.O., Vader, Extrema, Fabio Lione, Forgotten Tomb, Fratello Metallo, Trick or Treat, Ecnephias, Symbolyc

2010

9 August in Sant'Arcangelo Cannibal Corpse, Korpiklaani, Pino Scotto, Handful of Hate, Airborn, Marshall, Ver Sacrum, Solisia

2011
20 August in Chiaromonte Bulldozer, Majesty, Bömbers (feat. Abbath), Node, PTSD, Tyrannizer Order, Aura, Stige

2012

25 August in Chiaromonte Dark Tranquillity, Rhapsody of Fire, Rotting Christ, Ecnephias, Vexed, Lunocode, Poemisia, Twilight Gate, Ghost Booster

2013
10 August in Senise Overkill, Stratovarius, Marduk, Eldritch, Folkstone, Heavenshine, Blind Horizon, Rebürn

2014 
 23 August in Senise Carcass, Entombed A.D., Belphegor, Buffalo Grillz, Elvenking, Eversin, Sinheresy, Lehman

2015 
9 August in Chiaromonte Obituary, Edguy, Inquisition, Necrodeath, Forgotten Tomb, Arthemis, Feline Melinda, Carthagods

2016 
21 August in Chiaromonte Therion, Exodus, Taake, Fleshgod Apocalypse, Nanowar of Steel, Dewfall, De La Muerte, Real Chaos

2017 
19 August in Chiaromonte Venom, Sodom, White Skull, In.Si.Dia, Assaulter, Gravestone, Ghost of Mary, Memories of a Lost Soul

2018 
19 August in Chiaromonte Death SS, Pestilence, Folkstone, Necrodeath, Witchunter, Ad Noctem Funeriis, Circle of Witches, Rome in Monochrome

2019 
17 August in Chiaromonte Napalm Death, Death Angel, Carpathian Forest, Strana Officina, Carthagods, The Black, Scream Baby Scream

2022 
6 August in Senise Asphyx, Nargaroth, Vanexa, Fulci, Sailing To Nowhere, Napoli Violenta, Funeral, Mirko Gisonte, Eyelids

References

External links

Official website

Heavy metal festivals in Italy
1995 establishments in Italy
Music festivals established in 1995